Erik Kuld Jensen (10 June 1925 – 14 April 2004) was a Danish footballer. He was also part of Denmark's squad for the football tournament at the 1948 Summer Olympics, but he did not play in any matches.

References

External links
 Danish national team profile
 Profile
 Profile
 
 

1925 births
Danish men's footballers
Denmark international footballers
Danish expatriate men's footballers
Expatriate footballers in France
Aarhus Gymnastikforening players
Lille OSC players
Olympique Lyonnais players
AS Troyes-Savinienne players
Olympique de Marseille players
Ligue 1 players
Ligue 2 players
Footballers at the 1948 Summer Olympics
Olympic footballers of Denmark
Olympic bronze medalists for Denmark
Association football forwards
2004 deaths
Danish football managers
Aarhus Gymnastikforening managers
Olympic medalists in football
Footballers from Aarhus
Medalists at the 1948 Summer Olympics
Pays d'Aix FC players